
Lac des Chavonnes is a lake in the municipality of Ormont-Dessous, above Villars-sur-Ollon, Vaud, Switzerland.

See also
List of mountain lakes of Switzerland

External links

The legend of the Lac des Chavonnes 

Lakes of the canton of Vaud
Lakes of Switzerland